Ian McFadyen (born 8 July 1948) is an Australian television writer, actor, director and producer. He is best known as the creator and producer of the Australian television series The Comedy Company, which he also directed and wrote episodes for, and performed in, which ran from 16 February 1988 to 11 November 1990. One of McFadyen's most memorable characters on the show was "David Rabbitborough", a parodic impersonation of British naturalist David Attenborough.

McFadyen hosted the Australian version of Cluedo, and was the creator of the Network Ten sketch comedy show The Wedge. In 2009, he played a vampire in an advertisement for Australian lotteries. He also wrote "The Bounty Hunter", episode 4 for the new Doctor Who spin-off TV series K-9. In 1983 he played the part of Detective Mears in the iconic Australian TV series Prisoner.

McFadyen is the author of the book Mind Wars: The Battle for Your Brain, published by Allen & Unwin. He also co-wrote the satirical novel Going Out Backwards (2015) with Ross Fitzgerald.

Filmography

Producer

Actor/performer

Screenwriter

Director

Appearances

Production assistant

References

External links 

 Ian McFadyen's web site

Australian male television actors
Australian television directors
Australian game show hosts
Living people
1948 births
Male actors from Melbourne
People from Pascoe Vale, Victoria
Television personalities from Melbourne
Writers from Melbourne